Renata Małgorzata Mauer-Różańska (born 23 April 1969 in Nasielsk) is a Polish sport shooter. She is a two-time Olympic champion, at the 1996 Summer Olympics in Atlanta and the 2000 Summer Olympics in Sydney, as well as having an Olympic bronze medal. In 1996, she was voted the Polish Sportspersonality of the Year.

For her sport achievements, she received the Order of Polonia Restituta: 
 Knight's Cross (5th Class) in 1996, 
 Officer's Cross (4th Class) in 2000.

References

1969 births
Living people
People from Nasielsk
Polish people of German descent
Polish female sport shooters
ISSF rifle shooters
Shooters at the 1992 Summer Olympics
Shooters at the 1996 Summer Olympics
Shooters at the 2000 Summer Olympics
Shooters at the 2004 Summer Olympics
Olympic shooters of Poland
Olympic gold medalists for Poland
Olympic bronze medalists for Poland
Olympic medalists in shooting
Knights of the Order of Polonia Restituta
Officers of the Order of Polonia Restituta
Sportspeople from Masovian Voivodeship
Medalists at the 2000 Summer Olympics
Medalists at the 1996 Summer Olympics